Samuel Lewis Zager is an American politician and physician serving as a member of the Maine House of Representatives from the 41st district, which is part of the city of Portland. Elected in November 2020, he assumed office on December 2, 2020.

Early life and education 
Zager was born in Subic Bay, Philippines. After attending the Brookdale Community College, he earned a Bachelor of Science in naval history from the United States Naval Academy. He later earned a Master of Philosophy from University College, Oxford. After completing pre-med courses at the University of Washington Medical Center, he earned a Doctor of Medicine from Harvard Medical School.

Career 
Zager served as an intelligence officer in the United States Navy from 1993 to 2004.  During his medical studies, Zager completed a residency in family medicine at the Maine Medical Center. He later became a family physician at Martin's Point Health Care. He has also worked as a medical volunteer at the Deering High School-Based Health Center and a professor at the Tufts University School of Medicine. Zager was elected to the Maine House of Representatives in November 2020 and assumed office on December 2, 2020.

References 

Year of birth missing (living people)
Living people
Brookdale Community College alumni
United States Naval Academy alumni
Alumni of University College, Oxford
Harvard Medical School alumni
Democratic Party members of the Maine House of Representatives
Physicians from Maine
Tufts University School of Medicine faculty
Politicians from Portland, Maine